, son of Iemoto, was a kugyō or Japanese court noble of the Kamakura period (1185–1333). He held a regent position kampaku from 1313 and 1315. With a commoner he had a son Tsunetada.

References
 

1282 births
1324 deaths
Fujiwara clan
Konoe family
People of Kamakura-period Japan